Jeotgalibacillus alimentarius is a bacterium, the type species of its genus. It was first isolated from jeotgal, hence its name. It is a moderately halophilic, round-endospore-forming bacterium, with type strain YKJ-13T (= KCCM 80002T = JCM 10872T).

References

Further reading
De Vos, Paul. Endospore-forming soil bacteria. Ed. Niall A. Logan. Vol. 27. Springer, 2011. 
Horikoshi, Koki, ed. Extremophiles Handbook:... Vol. 1. Springer, 2011.

External links

LPSN
Type strain of Jeotgalibacillus alimentarius at BacDive -  the Bacterial Diversity Metadatabase

Bacillales
Bacteria described in 2001